A Heart Beats for You is a 1949 German romance film directed by Joe Stöckel and starring Rudolf Prack, Annelies Reinhold and Franz Loskarn.

The film was shot in 1944, and was due for release in 1945 but did not premiere before the end of the war. Like several other Nazi-era films it was given a delayed release.

It was made at the Bavaria Studios in Munich. The film's sets were designed by the art director Kurt Dürnhöfer and Max Seefelder.

Cast
 Rudolf Prack as Martin Hellwanger, Bauer
 Annelies Reinhold as Regina, seine Frau
 Franz Loskarn as Lois, Großknecht
 Kurt Baumann-Grandeit as Peter, Knecht
 Klaramaria Skala as Gertraud, Magd
 Paula Braend as Großdirn
 Edeltraud Schenk as Vroni, Kucheldirn
 Michl Lang as Hagbauer, Bürgermeister
 Hannes Keppler as Erlhofer
 Karl Skraup as Vinzenz Haunstetter, Pfannenflicker
 Martha Kunig-Rinach as Maria Haunstetter
 Ludwig Meier as Der kleine Andreas
 Alfred Pongratz as Vollmershauser, Holzhändler
 Emil Matousek as Michael - sein Sohn
 Thea Aichbichler as Monika, seine Frau
  as Wiesmatinger - ein alter Bauer

See also
 Überläufer

References

Bibliography
 Bock, Hans-Michael & Bergfelder, Tim. The Concise Cinegraph: Encyclopaedia of German Cinema. Berghahn Books, 2009.

External links 
 

1949 films
1940s romance films
German romance films
West German films
1940s German-language films
Films directed by Joe Stöckel
Bavaria Film films
Films shot at Bavaria Studios
German black-and-white films
1940s German films